Mehryar Mohri is a Professor and theoretical computer scientist at the Courant Institute of Mathematical Sciences. He is also a Research Director 
at Google Research where he heads the Learning Theory team.

Career
Prior to joining the Courant Institute, Mohri was a Research Department Head and later Technology Leader at AT&T Bell Labs, where he was a Member of the Technical Staff for about ten years. Mohri has also taught as an Assistant Professor at the University of Paris 7 (1992-1993) and Ecole Polytechnique (1992-1994).

Research
Mohri's main area of research is machine learning, in particular learning theory. He is also an expert in automata theory and algorithms. He is the author of several core algorithms that have served as the foundation for the design of many deployed speech recognition and natural language processing systems.

Publications
Mohri is the author of the reference book Foundations of Machine Learning used as a textbook in many graduate-level machine learning courses.
Mohri is also a member of the Lothaire group of mathematicians with the pseudonym
M. Lothaire and contributed to the book on Applied Combinatorics on Words. He is 
the author of more than 250 conference and journal publications.

Organizational affiliations
Mohri is currently the President of the Association for Algorithmic Learning Theory (AALT) and the Steering Committee Chair for the ALT conference.
He is also Editorial Board member of Machine Learning and TheoretiCS, Action Editor of the Journal of Machine Learning Research (JMLR)
and a member of the advisory board for the Journal of Automata, Languages and Combinatorics.

References

American computer scientists
Courant Institute of Mathematical Sciences faculty
University of Paris alumni
Living people
Machine learning researchers
Natural language processing researchers
1964 births
Academic staff of École Polytechnique